The New Taipei Municipal Hsing Wu High School is a secondary school in Linkou District, New Taipei, Taiwan.

History
Ku Huai-tsu founded the school in 1963. The school's first class had 113 students. The school was fully established in 1969.

Notable alumni
 Pai Hsiao-yen

See also
 Education in Taiwan

References

External links

 Hsing Wu High School  
 Hsing Wu High School  (Archive)
 English (Archive)

1963 establishments in Taiwan
Educational institutions established in 1963
Schools in New Taipei